The Houli culture (6500–5500 BC) was a Neolithic culture in Shandong, China. The people of the culture lived in square, semi-subterranean houses. The most commonly found artefacts at Houli sites are pottery and stone tools. Jade artefacts and bone, antler, shell tools were also found at Houli sites. While the remains of domesticated dogs and pigs in the early stages of domestication were found at some sites associated with the culture, the people of the Houli culture relied mostly on hunting and fishing. The remains of rice, broomcorn millet, and foxtail millet were discovered at Houli sites.

The type site at Houli was discovered in the Linzi District of Shandong and was excavated from 1989 to 1990. The culture was followed by the Beixin culture.

Currently, about a dozen sites have been found to be associated with the Houli culture. Five sites from the culture have been excavated so far. Aside from the type site at Houli, excavations have also taken place at Xihe, Xiaojingshan, Qianbuxia, and Yuezhang.

The Yuezhang site
Archaeologists excavated domesticated millet from the Yuezhuang site. The millet found at Yuezhuang was predominantly broomcorn millet and dated to around 8000 BP, making it one of the earliest sites in China to show evidence of millet cultivation. Rice grains were also found at the site. The carbonized rice was dated using AMS radiocarbon dating to 8010-7700 BP. Footed stone grinding slabs, in a style identical to those found at the Peiligang culture, were discovered at Yuezhang. This similarity is most likely due to technological transfer. No evidence for domesticated animals were found at Yuezhang, as the animal bones found at the site all came from wild animals.

See also
 List of Neolithic cultures of China
 Peiligang culture

Notes

References

Bibliography
 Allan, Sarah (ed), The Formation of Chinese Civilization: An Archaeological Perspective, 
 
 
 

Neolithic cultures of China
History of Shandong
7th-millennium BC establishments